The 2005 Maharashtra floods impacted many parts of the Indian state of Maharashtra including large areas of the metropolis Mumbai, a city located on the coast of the Arabian Sea, on the Western coast of India, in which approximately 1,094 people died. It occurred just one month after the June 2005 Gujarat floods. The term 26 July, is used to refer to the day when the city of Mumbai came to a standstill due to flooding.

Many people were stranded on the roads, lost their homes while many walked long distances back home from work that evening. The floods were caused by the eighth heaviest-ever recorded 24-hour rainfall figure of 944 mm (37.17 inches) which lashed the metropolis on 26 July 2005, and intermittently continued for the next day. 644mm (25.35 inches) was received within the 12-hour period between 8 am and 8 pm. Torrential rainfall continued for the next week. The highest 24-hour period in India was 1,168 mm (46.0 inches) in Aminidivi in the Union Territory of Lakshadweep on 6 May 2004 although some reports suggest that it was a new Indian record. The previous record high rainfall in a 24-hour period for Mumbai was 575 mm (22.6 inches) in 1974.

Other places severely affected were Raigad, Chiplun and Khed, Guhagar.

Overview

Timeline
On 26 July 2005, around 2:00 pm, the Mumbai Metropolitan Region was struck by a severe storm and subsequent deluge. The Indian Meteorological Department (IMD) station in Santacruz recorded . This is the wettest day on record in Mumbai.

Local train movement came to a halt by 2:30 p.m. due to the water-logging on the tracks. This caused traffic on roads to increase dramatically with water logging and submerging of certain low-lying pockets of the region, such as Dharavi and Bandra-Kurla Complex.

Thousands of school children were stranded due to flooding and could not reach home for up to 24 hours. The following two days were declared as school and college holidays by the state government.

Threat to public health
The rain water caused the sewage system to overflow and all water lines were contaminated. The Government ordered all housing societies to add chlorine to their water tanks.

Financial effect
The financial cost of floods was unprecedented and these floods caused a stoppage of entire commercial, trading, and industrial activity for days. Preliminary indications indicate that the floods caused a direct loss of about ₹5.50 billion (€80 million or US$100 million). The financial impact of the floods were manifested in a variety of ways:

 The banking transactions across the counters were adversely affected and many branches and commercial establishments were unable to function from late evening of 26 July 2005.  The state government declared 27 and 28 July as public holidays. ATM networks of several banks, which included the State Bank of India, the nation's largest national bank; ICICI Bank, HDFC Bank, and several foreign banks like Citibank and HSBC, stopped functioning from the afternoon of 26 July 2005 at all the centres of Mumbai. ATM transactions could not be carried out in several parts of India on 26 July or 27 July due to failure of the connectivity with their central systems located in Mumbai.
The BSE and the NSE, the premier stock exchanges of India could function only partially. Electronic trading platforms of the brokerage houses across the country remained largely inoperative. In partial trading, the Sensex, India's most tracked equity index closed at an all-time high of 7605.03 on 27 July 2005. The Exchanges, however, remained closed for the following day.

Effect on Mumbai's links to the rest of the world
For the first time ever, Mumbai's airports (Chhatrapati Shivaji Maharaj International Airport and Juhu Aerodrome) were shut for more than 30 hours due to heavy flooding of the runways, submerged Instrument Landing System equipment and extremely poor visibility. Over 700 flights were cancelled or delayed. The airports reopened on the morning of 28 July 2005. Within 24 hours of the airports becoming operational, there were 185 departures and 184 arrivals, including international flights. Again from early morning of 31 July, with increase in water logging of the runways and different parts of Mumbai, most of the flights were indefinitely cancelled.
 Rail links were disrupted, and reports on late evening of 30 July indicated cancellation of several long distance trains till 6 August 2005.
 The Mumbai-Pune Expressway, which witnessed a number of landslides, was closed the first time ever in its history, for 24 hours.
 According to the Hindustan Times, an unprecedented 5 million mobile and 2.3 million MTNL landline users were hit for over four hours.
 According to the .in registrar (personal communication), the .in DNS servers in Mumbai had to be reconfigured because the servers were not operational.

Transport stats
52 local trains damaged
37,000 autorickshaws spoiled
4,000 taxis damaged
900 BEST buses damaged
10,000 trucks and tempos grounded

Factors aggravating the flood of 26th July 2005 in Mumbai

Antiquated drainage system
The present storm-water drainage system in Mumbai was put in place in the early 20th century and is capable of carrying only 25.1237 millimetres of water per hour which was extremely inadequate on a day when 993 mm of rain fell in the city.  The drainage system was also clogged at several places.

Only 3 'outfalls' (ways out to the sea) are equipped with floodgates whereas the remaining 102 open directly into the sea for more than 24 hours. As a result, there is no way to stop the seawater from rushing into the drainage system during high tide.

In 1990, an ambitious plan was drawn to overhaul the city's storm water drainage system which had never been reviewed in over 50 years. A project costing approximately 6 billion rupees was proposed by UK based consultants hired by the Brihanmumbai Municipal Corporation to study the matter. Implementation of the project would have ensured that rainwater did not flood the streets of Mumbai. The project was planned to have completed by 2002 and aimed to enhance the drainage system through larger diameter storm water drains and pipes, using pumps wherever necessary and removing encroachments. The project, if implemented would have doubled the storm water carrying capacity to 50 mm per hour.

The BMC committee had rejected the proposed project on the grounds that it was "too costly". These were few of the drawbacks due to which the city suffered so gravely.

Uncontrolled, unplanned development in Northern Suburbs
Development in certain parts of Mumbai is haphazard and buildings are constructed without proper planning. The drainage plans in northern suburbs is chalked out as and when required in a particular area and not from an overall point of view.

The Environment Ministry of the Government of India was informed in the early 1990s that sanctioning the Bandra-Kurla complex (a commercial complex in northern Mumbai) was leading to disaster. No environment clearance is mandatory for large urban construction projects in northern Mumbai. Officials in the environment ministry claimed that it was not practical to impose new guidelines with retrospective effect "as there are millions of buildings".

Destruction of mangrove ecosystems

Mangrove ecosystems which exist along the Mithi River and Mahim Creek are being destroyed and replaced with construction. Hundreds of acres of swamps in Mahim creek have been reclaimed and put to use for construction by builders. These ecosystems serve as a buffer between land and sea. It is estimated that Mumbai has lost about 40% of its mangroves between 1995 and 2005, some to builders and some to encroachment (slums). Sewage and garbage dumps have also destroyed mangroves. The Bandra-Kurla complex in particular was created by replacing such swamps. The most acclaimed Mindspace CBD (Inorbit Mall) in Goregaon & Malad has been built by destroying a large patch of mangroves in Maharashtra.

Academic research 
The floods have been the subject of research by scientists and social scientists attempting to understand the causes, impacts, and short/long term consequences. Scholars have studied the floods in Mumbai from the perspectives of climate change, disaster management / mitigation, urban health, vulnerability and adaptation, hydrology, environmental degradation and encroachment etc. Kapil Gupta (2007) assesses urban flood resilience, while Andharia (2006) contrasts the "widespread acts of generosity and altruism" in Mumbai with the general social disorder that was seen in the aftermath of Hurricane Katrina in New Orleans. Aromar Revi (2005) draws lessons from the floods for prioritising multi-hazard risk mitigation. Parthasarathy (2009) links social and environmental insecurities to show that the most marginalised groups were also the most affected by the floods.

Role of climate change 
Climate change has played an important role in causing large-scale floods across central India, especially the Mumbai floods of 2005. During 1901–2015, there has been a three-fold rise in widespread extreme rainfall events, over the entire central belt of India from Mumbai to Bhubaneshwar, leading to a steady rise in the number of flash floods. The rising number of extreme rain events are attributed to an increase in the fluctuations of the monsoon westerly winds, due to increased warming in the Arabian Sea. This results in occasional surges of moisture transport from the Arabian Sea to the subcontinent, resulting in widespread heavy rains lasting for 2–3 days. The Mumbai 2005 floods also occurred due to moisture surge from the Arabian Sea, and the heavy rains were not confined to Mumbai but spread over a large region across central India.

In popular culture 
The disaster was featured in a National Geographic documentary, titled Mumbai Mega Flood.
Tum Mile, a 2009 Indian Hindi drama film is set against the backdrop of the disaster.

See also
 Disaster Management Act, 2005

References

BBC News
BBC Updates
Mumbai Help A blog dedicated to disseminate information on emergency services, helplines, infolines, relief/rehab organisations and their activities etc.
Cloudburst Mumbai A blog dedicated for news, links and personal stories related to this tragedy.
Anjaria, Jonathan Shapiro "Urban Calamities: A View From Mumbai", Space and Culture, Vol. 9, No. 1, 80–82, 2006
Gupta, Kapil, "Urban flood resilience planning and management and lessons for the future: a case study of Mumbai, India", Urban Water Journal, Volume 4, Issue 3, 2007
Parthasarathy, D, "Social and environmental insecurities in Mumbai: towards a sociological perspective on vulnerability", South African Review of Sociology, Volume 40, Issue 1, 2009
Revi, Aromar, "Lessons from the Deluge: Priorities for Multi-Hazard Risk Mitigation", Economic and Political Weekly, Vol. 40, No. 36 (3–9 Sep 2005), pp. 3911–3916

External links
Photos of the disaster from Yahoo! News
Helpline Numbers A list of Helpline Numbers

2005 natural disasters
2005 disasters in India
2005
History of Mumbai (1947–present)
History of Maharashtra (1947–present)
Disasters in Maharashtra
Floods